Major General Nathan Apea Aferi (September 1923 – 8 April 2003) was a soldier and politician in Ghana. He was a former Chief of the Defence Staff of Ghana. He also served briefly as Foreign Minister of Ghana.

Career

Congo
Aferi served with the United Nations Operation in the Congo now the Democratic Republic of Congo. At the time, he was a lieutenant colonel in the Ghana army. He is reported to have been on guard at Radio Congo when Patrice Lumumba attempted a broadcast in the confusion around the time of Congo's independence in 1960 from Belgium.

Chief of Defence Staff 
Aferi continued in the military on his return to Ghana where he rose to the rank of brigadier. He was promoted Major General and made the Chief of Defence Staff (CDS) after the dismissal of Major General Otu, then CDS by President Nkrumah. He was the last CDS to serve before the overthrow of Nkrumah in Ghana's first military coup.

Politics 
Aferi was the first Commissioner for Foreign Affairs in the National Redemption Council military government of General Kutu Acheampong in 1972.

Death 
Aferi died on April 8, 2003 in Accra, Ghana.

References 

1922 births
2003 deaths
Ghanaian soldiers
Foreign ministers of Ghana
Local government ministers of Ghana
People of the Congo Crisis
Ghanaian expatriates in the Democratic Republic of the Congo